Rewan Kruger (born 20 March 1998) is a South African rugby union player for the  in the Currie Cup. His regular position is scrum-half.

Kruger was named in the  side for the 2022 Currie Cup Premier Division.

References

South African rugby union players
Living people
Rugby union scrum-halves
Cheetahs (rugby union) players
Free State Cheetahs players
1998 births